Dietmar Bär (born 5 February 1961, in Dortmund) is a German actor. Since 1997 he has starred as Freddy Schenk in the popular television crime series Tatort and in Ärzte (a TV Series in 1994). He has been in several films, including Männer by Doris Dörrie. He is a narrator of many audiobooks translated into German.

Early life
In 1981, Bär graduated from the Dortmund Leibniz-Gymnasium. During his schooling, he became a member of the Sozialistische Deutsche Arbeiterjugend (SDAJ). He was noticed for his acting talent in various school theater projects. Later, he became a singer of a Dortmund-based punk band, Planlos, through the 80s. He then trained as an actor from 1982 to 1985 at the Westfälische Schauspielschule Bochum. One of his first acting roles was in 1984, as a football club hooligan for MSV Duisburg in the crime series Tatort (episode Two kinds of blood).

Career
Bär received his first lead role in 1984, appearing Dominik Graf's hit (TV Movie)  as 'Franz'. Then in 1985, he played a minor role 'Lothar' in Men... (German: Männer) directed by Doris Dörrie. Also in 1985, followed by an acting commitment to the Landestheater Tübingen. From 1988 to 1990 and from 1992 to 1994 he appeared at the Wuppertal theatres. Alongside veteran actor Willy Millowitsch, he played 'Mike Döpper' in detective series of Kommissar Klefisch between 1990-1996. Bär is best known as Tatort Commissioner 'Freddy Schenk', whom he has been playing since 1997 alongside 'Max Ballauf', played by Klaus J. Behrendt.

At the Gandersheim Cathedral Festival in the summer of 2007 and 2008, Bär played the village judge 'Adam' in Kleist's comedy play The Broken Jug. Since 2010, he has performed at the Schauspielhaus Bochum, in the play Eisenstein as Vincent Hufnagel (old) and Lothar.

Bär also has narrated many audiobooks into German, for various authors, including Mo Hayder, Håkan Nesser, Jacques Berndorf, Thomas Krugerand and Stieg Larsson.

Personal life
Together with the Berlin association pro futura, Bär supports the future prospects of young people and the long-term unemployed. In addition, he founded with members of the show Tatort Roads of the World e. V.  in 1998, which campaigns for Filipino street children. This was inspired by the much-acclaimed Tatort episode 'Manila' filmed in 1998, which dealt with the fate of Filipino street children and child maltreatment. For this, he and Klaus J. Behrendt received from Kinderlachen Eingetragener Verein which cares for sick and poor children mainly in Germany, the KIND Award. He regularly tours with the Irish Father Shay Cullen, who cares for street children in the Philippines, through Germany, promoting fair trade as a concept of success against poverty and discrimination of the people in the Philippines and elsewhere.

In addition, Bär is committed to the German bone marrow donor database, through poster advertising campaigns. He has also appeared in a campaign for the victims of crime as part of the Weisser Ring.

Bär is also a member of the Bundesverband Schauspiel (Federal Association of Acting, BFFS).

Since 15 April 2009, Bär has been married to Maren Geissler. He is an avowed fan of the football club Borussia Dortmund, a love also shared by his Tatort character Freddy Schenk.

Selected filmography
1984: 
1985: 
1985: Men...
1996: Wer hat Angst vorm Weihnachtsmann?
1998: The Big Mambo
1998: Kai Rabe gegen die Vatikankiller
2002: If It Don't Fit, Use a Bigger Hammer
2004: Guys and Balls
2006: Oh, wie schön ist Panama (speaker)
2007: Unter Freunden (Film der Realschule Bad Gandersheim)
2010:

References

External links
Interview with Dietmar Bär
Interview with Klaus J. Behrendt and Dietmar Bär

1961 births
Living people
German male television actors
German male film actors
20th-century German male actors
21st-century German male actors
Actors from Dortmund
Audiobook narrators